The 2022 Piala Belia (transl. Youth Cup) was the 11th season of the Piala Belia since its establishment in 2008. The league is currently the youth level (U19) football league in Malaysia. Terengganu IV are the defending champions. 18 teams competed in this season. All teams were drawn into three different groups. The top two teams from each groups and the two best third-place teams after the completion of group stage matches progressed to knockout stage.

Teams 
The following teams were participating in the 2022 Piala Belia.

The 18 teams are divided into three groups, namely Group A (North Zone) consisting of 5 teams from the North and East Zone, Group B (South Zone) with 7 teams from the South, East and Central Zone while Group C (Central Zone) with 6 teams from the Zone Central, Eastern and Borneo.

Group stage 
The group level competition will take place home and away from 23 February to 17 July 2022 with the eight best teams which are the top two teams in each group and the two best third place teams in the group will qualify for the Quarter-finals.

Group A 

<onlyinclude>

Group B

Group C

Ranking of third-place teams 
The top two third-place teams will advance to knockout stage.

Knockout stage 
The Quarter-finals (25 and 31 July 2022), Semi-finals (7 and 14 August 2022) and final (19 and 26 August 2022) will take place home and away.

Bracket

Top goalscorers 
A total of 130 players scored goals.

See also 
 Piala Belia

 Piala Presiden

References

External Links 

 Football Association of Malaysia
 Berita Bola Sepak Terkini

Football cup competitions in Malaysia
2022 in Malaysian football
Piala Belia